Malerisaurus is an extinct genus of archosauromorph known from Andhra Pradesh of India and Texas of the USA.

Description
Malerisaurus was a medium-sized archosauromorph which averaged 1.2 meters in length. Malerisaurus is known from the holotype ISIR 150, two articulated and almost complete skeletons which were discovered as the presumable gastric contents of two skeletons of Parasuchus hislopi. It was collected from the Lower Maleri Formation, dating to the late Carnian or early Norian stage of the Late Triassic. Malerisaurus robinsonae was a small archosauromorph, probably capable of climbing trees and swimming. The skull has some adaptations to a carnivorous diet, but is nevertheless unspecialised and probably more of an insectivore. Malerisaurus, seen as a diapsid skull, shows primitive and advanced facies in its unossified laterosphenoid, absence of antorbital and mandibular fenestrae, gracile form, primitive girdles, elongated cervicals and absence of dermal armour. Chatterjee (1980) assigned it to the suborder Prolacertiformes, which currently represents four families: Sharovipterygidae, Protorosauridae, Prolacertidae and Tanystropheidae. Chatterjee provisionally regarded Malerisaurus as close to Protorosaurus.

A second species, M. langstoni, is known from the holotype TMM 31099-11, a partial but poorly preserved skeleton. It was collected in the Otis Chalk Quarry 2 (TMM 31099 locality) from the Colorado City Formation, Chinle Group, dating to the early Carnian stage of the Late Triassic, about 228–227.5 million years ago. It was found in the Howard County of Texas. Spielmann et al. (2006) redescribed the type material of M. langstoni and concluded that it's indistinguishable from the type species of Trilophosaurus, T. buettneri, and thus M. langstoni represents its junior synonym.

Nesbitt et al. (2017) reinterpreted Malerisaurus as an allokotosaurian archosauromorph belonging to the family Azendohsauridae. In 2021, Nesbitt et al. once again looked at Malerisaurus, and found it to be an early-diverging, but late surviving, carnivorous azendohsaurid. This study also found M. langstoni to be a valid species of Malerisaurus.

Etymology
Malerisaurus was named by Sankar Chatterjee in 1980 and the type species is Malerisaurus robinsonae named in honour of the British Paleontologist who worked in India, Pamela Lamplugh Robinson. A second species, M. langstoni, was named by him in 1986. The generic name is derived from the name of the Lower Maleri Formation, where the holotype of the type species was collected, and sauros, Greek for "lizard". The specific name of M. langstoni honors the American paleontologist and professor Wann Langston, Jr.

References

Allokotosaurs
Prehistoric reptile genera
Late Triassic reptiles of Asia
Late Triassic reptiles of North America
Triassic India
Fossils of India
Triassic geology of Texas
Paleontology in Texas
Fossil taxa described in 1980